Comitas kaderlyi, common name Kaderly's turrid, is a species of sea snail, a marine gastropod mollusc in the family Pseudomelatomidae, the turrids and allies.

Description
The length of the shell varies between 44 mm and 100 mm.

The whorls are subangulated with about twelve oblique, rounded, longitudinal ribs below the angle. The surface is decussated by growth lines and small revolving striae. The shell is yellowish white, with orange-brown bands on the shoulder, at the base and intermediately three in all, the upper one appearing on the spire.

Distribution
This marine species occurs off Japan, the Philippines and Madagascar

References

 .Lischke (1872),  Mai. Blat., xix, p. 100
 Cernohorsky, Walter O. "Taxonomic notes on some deep-water Turridae (Mollusca: Gastropoda) from the Malagasy Republic." Records of the Auckland Institute and Museum (1987): 123-134.
 Liu J.Y. [Ruiyu] (ed.). (2008). Checklist of marine biota of China seas. China Science Press. 1267 pp.

External links
 
 

kaderlyi
Gastropods described in 1872